River Cities FC was an American women's soccer team, founded in 2004. The team was a member of the Women's Premier Soccer League, the third tier of women's soccer in the United States and Canada, until 2007, when the team left the league and the franchise was terminated.
The team played its home games in a stadium in Edwardsville, Illinois.

They used to be called the St. Louis Archers.

Year-by-year

Honors
 WPSL Midwest Conference Champions 2006
|}

Competition history

Coaches
 2004 Wendy Dillinger
 2005 Beth Goetz

All-time roster

External links
 Official site

   

Women's Premier Soccer League teams
Women's soccer clubs in Illinois
2004 establishments in Illinois